Easton Michael Stick (born September 15, 1995) is an American football quarterback for the Los Angeles Chargers of the National Football League (NFL). He played college football at North Dakota State.

College career
He graduated from Creighton Preparatory School in Omaha, Nebraska, and played college football at North Dakota State University. With a 49–3 record as a starter at North Dakota State, Stick holds the record for most wins by a starting quarterback in NCAA Division I FCS history. He was drafted by the Chargers in the fifth round of the 2019 NFL Draft.

Professional career

Los Angeles Chargers
Stick was drafted by the Los Angeles Chargers in the fifth round with the 166th overall pick in the 2019 NFL Draft. In the 2019 season, he took snaps under center in the preseason. He did not appear in any games in the regular season. During the beginning of the 2020 season, Stick was expected to take over the backup quarterback position, replacing Tyrod Taylor. Instead, Chase Daniel was signed on as a backup while Stick was not set to play.

During Week 3 of the 2020 regular season, Stick briefly entered the game after starting quarterback Justin Herbert was apparently injured. Before Stick could take the first snap of his career, however, the Chargers called a timeout and substituted Herbert back into the game.

On March 13, 2023, the Chargers re-signed Stick to a one year deal, keeping him as a backup for Herbert.

References

External links
Los Angeles Chargers bio
North Dakota State Bison bio

1995 births
Living people
Sportspeople from Omaha, Nebraska
Players of American football from Nebraska
American football quarterbacks
North Dakota State Bison football players
Los Angeles Chargers players